Hugo Briatta (born 24 June 1996) is a French cross-country mountain biker. He specializes in the cross-country eliminator event, in which he finished second at the world championships in 2018 and 2019. He was also the European champion in 2019.

He is also an engineer, and graduated from INSA Rouen in 2020.

Major results

2017
 UCI XCE World Cup
1st Antwerp
 2nd National Under-23 XCO Championships
2018
 2nd  UCI World XCE Championships
 2nd National XCE Championships
2019
 1st Overall UCI XCE World Cup
1st Villard-de-Lans
1st Volterra
1st Graz
 1st  European XCE Championships
 1st  National XCE Championships
 2nd  UCI World XCE Championships
2020
 3rd  European XCE Championships
 3rd National XCE Championships

References

External links

French male cyclists
French mountain bikers
Living people
1996 births